ThrillerVideo was a horror home video series that began being released in February 1985 to 1987 by U.S.A. Home Video and International Video Entertainment (I.V.E.).

Background

Released on VHS and Betamax, many of the "films" released by ThrillerVideo were actually episodes of the British TV shows Thriller and Hammer House of Horror.  Many of the titles in the series were hosted by TV horror hostess Elvira, Mistress of the Dark, who declined to be associated with slasher movies and films involving animal cruelty, so titles such as Make Them Die Slowly, Seven Doors of Death, and Buried Alive as well as later videos featuring episodes of Thriller were simply released without her.  Several of the Thriller episodes included two to three minutes of additional footage that was not seen in the original British broadcasts.

Releases

Hosted by Elvira
Alabama's Ghost
Attack of the Swamp Creature
The Carpathian Eagle
Charlie Boy
Children of the Full Moon
The Cyclops
Dead of Night (1977)
Dracula
Frankenstein
Growing Pains
Guardian of the Abyss
The House That Bled to Death
The Human Duplicators
The Monster Club
NATAS: The Reflection
The Picture of Dorian Gray
Rude Awakening
The Silent Scream
The Strange Case of Dr. Jekyll and Mr. Hyde
The Turn of the Screw (1974)
The Thirteenth Reunion
The Two Faces of Evil
Visitor from the Grave
Witching Time

Non-Elvira releases
Anatomy of Terror
Buried Alive
Death in Deep Water
The Devil's Web
Doctor Butcher, M.D.
If It's a Man, Hang Up
I'm the Girl He Wants to Kill
In the Steps of a Dead Man
The Invasion of Carol Enders
A Killer in Every Corner
Make Them Die Slowly
Murder Motel
The Next Victim
NightStalker
One Deadly Owner
Screamer
Seven Doors of Death
Tales from the Darkside (seven volumes)

References

External links
 Gallery of ThrillerVideo Covers
 Seth's ThrillerVideo Collection
 VHSCollector.com's ThrillerVideo Info & Covers

Direct-to-video horror films
Elvira, Mistress of the Dark